Marcia Miller Jobson (born Marcia Seton Miller; December 4, 1975) is a former American soccer midfielder and former head women's soccer coach at Baylor University.

Career
Jobson grew up in St. Charles, Illinois, where she led St. Charles East High School to two state soccer championships. She first attended and played college soccer for the University of Wisconsin–Madison; after two years, she transferred to Southern Methodist University. She then played for the Chicago Cobras of the W-League for four seasons, 1. FFC Turbine Potsdam of the women's Bundesliga for one season, and the Atlanta Beat of the WUSA for three seasons.  In 2004, she played for the W-League's Charlotte Eagles and Atlanta Silverbacks.

International career
Jobson made her first appearance for the U.S. women's team against Canada on June 26, 2005, making her the second-oldest American player to earn her first cap.  In July 2007, she was chosen for the U.S. 2007 FIFA Women's World Cup squad, making her the oldest U.S. player by four years to be named to a first World Cup roster.

Coaching career
Jobson was named head coach at Northern Illinois for the 2004 season, where her husband Paul was an assistant coach. She and Paul co-coached at Baylor University, with Marci contributing a record of 78-43-24 from 2008-14 as Baylor’s co-head coach. She stepped down to assistant coach in 2014, and both resigned at the end of 2021 with a combined record of 97-57-26, including back-to-back trips to the Elite Eight in 2017 and 2018. She and Paul run the Jobson Soccer academy.

Personal life
Jobson is the youngest of 8 children, whose names all begin with "M". She and Paul have four children.

References

External links
 US Soccer profile

1975 births
Living people
People from St. Charles, Illinois
American soccer coaches
United States women's international soccer players
1. FFC Turbine Potsdam players
Wisconsin Badgers women's soccer players
SMU Mustangs women's soccer players
Northern Illinois University faculty
Northern Illinois Huskies women's soccer coaches
Baylor Bears women's soccer coaches
Atlanta Beat (WUSA) players
American expatriate soccer players in Germany
2007 FIFA Women's World Cup players
American women's soccer players
Women's association football midfielders
American women academics
American expatriate women's soccer players
Chicago Cobras players
USL W-League (1995–2015) players
Women's United Soccer Association players